Mohamad Helmi Eliza bin Elias  (born 20 January 1983) is a Malaysian footballer who plays as a goalkeeper for Malaysia Super League club Sri Pahang.

Club career
He was a product of Kedah's youth system and started in the junior, Kedah FA President Cup squad during the 2001 season, but it wasn't until 2006–07 that he debuted on the senior side, replacing Megat Amir Faisal Al Khalidi Ibrahim left for a new challenges with Selangor FA, and the disappointing performance of Jamsari Sabian also made Helmi became the first choice goalie in Kedah's starting line-up beginning from 20 December 2006 in Super League match against Negeri Sembilan FA up until now.

The Malaysia FA Cup final on 30 June 2007 in Batu Kawan Stadium — Helmi helped Kedah FA win the second Malaysia FA Cup title after defeated Perlis FA. The match ended 0–0 and went to penalties, where Helmi saved two out of four penalties to gain the cup win with 4–2 result. After the match, he was awarded the "Man of the Match" award with a number of crucial saves in 120-minute play time.

On 23 August 2008, a few hours before the final Malaysia Cup 2007–08 reached its kick-off, Helmi was voted as the Most Popular Goalkeeper by fans in FAM Football Awards. He then conducted Kedah to retain Malaysia Cup after defeated Selangor 3–2.

International career
On 6 June 2008, Helmi was selected as goalkeeper for B. Sathianathan's first match in charge, a friendly against Indonesia. It was Helmi's first start for Malaysia after making a debut for Malaysia youth in the early 2000s. Helmi has now firmly re-established himself as Malaysia's first choice goalkeeper, having started every match during Sathianathan's reign.

He also appeared for the Malaysia XI (also known as Malaysia B that represents Malaysia for non 'A'  matches) squad against Chelsea F.C. at Shah Alam Stadium on 29 July 2008. Helmi could not stop Nicolas Anelka and Ashley Cole putting the Blues ahead. Even though they lost, Helmi will be remembered for a spectacular diving save to deny  Deco's thunderous 25-yard volley. Chelsea coach Luiz Felipe Scolari praised the Malaysia XI for giving a good fight against his team.

In the 2008 Merdeka Tournament, Helmi has not conceded any goals in 390 minutes of playing time after Malaysia beat Nepal and Sierra Leone 4–0 respectively in the group stage.  Malaysia won 4–0 against Myanmar in the semi-final. Despite him not conceding after extra-time in the final against Vietnam, Helmi could not save any penalty kicks. As a result, it was Vietnam who came out victorious, beating Malaysia 6–5 in a sudden death penalty shoot-out after the teams had tied 0–0.

In 2008 AFF Suzuki Cup, Helmi was blamed by the media and fans because of his poor performance against Vietnam. In the match, Helmi conceded a long shot by Nguyen Vu Phong in the 86 minute as Malaysia lost 2–3 to Vietnam.

So far Helmi has played eight FIFA 'A' matches and three non 'A' matches for Malaysia.

Career statistics

Club

International

Honours

Kedah 
 Malaysia Super League: 2006–07, 2007–08
 Malaysia Premier League: 2002, 2005–06
 Malaysia FA Cup: 2007, 2008
 Malaysia Cup: 2007, 2008

Pahang 
 Malaysia FA Cup: 2018

Individual 
 FAM Football Awards – Most Favourite Goalkeeper: 2006–2007, 2007–08
 FAM Football Awards – Most Malaysian Valuable Players: 2007–08

Personal life
Helmi was married on 14 November 2008.

References

External links
 
 

1983 births
Living people
Association football goalkeepers
Malaysian footballers
Malaysia international footballers
People from Kedah
Perlis FA players
Kedah Darul Aman F.C. players
Negeri Sembilan FA players
Malaysia Super League players
Malaysian people of Malay descent